Mayuko Goto (born 13 July 1995) is a Japanese freestyle swimmer. She competed in the women's 400 metre freestyle event at the 2018 FINA World Swimming Championships (25 m), in Hangzhou, China.

References

External links
 

1995 births
Living people
Japanese female freestyle swimmers
Place of birth missing (living people)